Frank Leidam Nodarse Chávez (born 6 December 2000) is a Cuban footballer who plays as a defender who currently plays for Rio Grande Valley FC in the USL Championship.

Career

Fort Lauderdale CF
After joining the club in early 2020, Nodarse made his debut for the club on 18 July 2020, playing the entirety of a 2-0 defeat to Greenville Triumph.

On 13 August 2021, Nodarse joined USL Championship side Charleston Battery on a short-term loan deal for three matches.

Rio Grande Valley FC
On 12 March 2022, Nodarse made the move to USL Championship club Rio Grande Valley FC.

Career statistics

Club

References

External links

2000 births
Living people
National Premier Soccer League players
Inter Miami CF II players
Charleston Battery players
Rio Grande Valley FC Toros players
USL League One players
USL Championship players
Cuban footballers
Cuba youth international footballers
Association football defenders
Cuban expatriate footballers
Cuban expatriate sportspeople in the United States
Expatriate soccer players in the United States